The Maelbeek or Maalbeek is a stream that runs through several municipalities in Brussels, including Etterbeek, Ixelles, Saint-Josse-ten-Noode, Schaerbeek. It is a tributary of the Zenne, which it joins up in Schaerbeek, from its source located to the south near the Abbey of La Cambre. The name Maalbeek, (meaning mill brook), comes from the Dutch words beek (meaning brook) and maal (meaning to mill). Molenbeek has a similar derivation. It was vaulted in 1872, at which time there were 58 ponds along the stream. Nowadays, only six are left: the ponds of the Abbey of La Cambre; of Ixelles (two); of Leopold Park; of Marie-Louise Square; and of Josaphat Park.

The Maelbeek/Maalbeek metro station is located in the central area of this Maalbeek valley.

There is another stream in the vicinity named Maalbeek, also a tributary to the Zenne, in Grimbergen and two other streams named Molenbeek, found in Beersel and in Laeken. The Woluwe river also has a tributary named Kleine (little) Maalbeek, in Kraainem.

See also
 Jardin du Maelbeek
 List of rivers of Belgium

Etterbeek
Ixelles
Saint-Josse-ten-Noode
Schaerbeek
Rivers of Belgium
Rivers of Brussels